Reinaldo Rodrigues de Oliveira Lobo (born April 5, 1988) known as Reinaldo Lobo is a Brazilian professional footballer who currently plays as a centre back for Altos.

Honours

Club
Penang
Malaysia Premier League: Promotion 2015

References

2. http://labbola.com/reinaldo-lobo-penang-fas-iron-wall/

External links
Profile at liga-indonesia.co.id 

1988 births
Living people
Brazilian footballers
Brazilian expatriate footballers
Association football forwards
Liga Portugal 2 players
Malaysia Super League players
Liga 1 (Indonesia) players
Campeonato Brasileiro Série D players
Figueirense FC players
Esporte Clube Itaúna players
F.C. Paços de Ferreira players
U.D. Oliveirense players
Grêmio Esportivo Novorizontino players
Mitra Kukar players
Penang F.C. players
PSMS Medan players
Associação Atlética de Altos players
Association football defenders
Brazilian expatriate sportspeople in Portugal
Brazilian expatriate sportspeople in Indonesia
Brazilian expatriate sportspeople in Malaysia
Expatriate footballers in Portugal
Expatriate footballers in Indonesia
Expatriate footballers in Malaysia